Oxycoleus carinatipennis is a species of beetle in the family Cerambycidae. It was described by Zajciw in 1964.

References

Cerambycinae
Beetles described in 1964